Ryan Paolo Arabejo (born October 30, 1989) is a swimmer from the Philippines. He swam for the Philippines at the 2008 Olympics.

He has swum for the Philippines at the:
Olympics: 2008
World Championships: 2007
Asian Games: 2006, 2010
Southeast Asian Games (SEA Games): 2005, 2007, 2009, 2011

Beginning in the 2010–11 school year, Arabejo attends and swims for the USA's Drury University in Springfield, Missouri.

References

1989 births
Living people
Filipino male swimmers
Olympic swimmers of the Philippines
Swimmers at the 2008 Summer Olympics
Swimmers at the 2006 Asian Games
Swimmers at the 2010 Asian Games
Drury Panthers men's swimmers
People from Makati
Sportspeople from Metro Manila
Male backstroke swimmers
Filipino male freestyle swimmers
Southeast Asian Games medalists in swimming
Southeast Asian Games gold medalists for the Philippines
Southeast Asian Games competitors for the Philippines
Southeast Asian Games silver medalists for the Philippines
Southeast Asian Games bronze medalists for the Philippines
Competitors at the 2005 Southeast Asian Games
Competitors at the 2007 Southeast Asian Games
Competitors at the 2009 Southeast Asian Games
Competitors at the 2011 Southeast Asian Games
Asian Games competitors for the Philippines
21st-century Filipino people
20th-century Filipino people